Changes is an album from the Latvian band Crow Mother released in December 2013. It is the first album by the band. The album contains 12 songs. The lead single of this album is "Changes".

Track listing
 "Electric Lady" 04:23
 "Sugar, Blood & Wine" 03:40
 "Spiders Lullabay" 04:38
 "Smile Like You Care" 02:43
 "Winterland" 04:18
 "Killing The Love" 02:58
 "Angel" 04:46
 "White Devil" 04:49
 "Underwather Games" 04:01
 "Don't Break The Chain" 04:40
 "The Only Cure" 04:27
 "Changes" 04:31

References

2013 albums